Satish Nanda was a first class cricketer from India, who played for Eastern Punjab and Delhi. He made his debut in 1951–52 season and played his last first class match in 1955–56 season.

References

External links
Satish Nanda on ESPNcricinfo

Indian cricketers
Delhi cricketers
Year of birth missing